Rik de Voest and Izak van der Merwe are the defending champions, but lost in the quarterfinals.
Steve Johnson and Austin Krajicek won the title, defeating Adam Hubble and Frederik Nielsen 3–6, 6–4, [13–11] in the final.

Seeds

Draw

Draw

References
 Main Draw
 Qualifying Draw

Knoxville Challenger - Doubles
2011 Doubles